There are two MIME assignments for XML data. These are:
application/xml (RFC 7303, previously RFC 3023)
text/xml (RFC 7303, previously RFC 3023)

However, since the introduction of RFC 7303, these are to be regarded as the same in all aspects except name.

Because of the wide variety of documents that can be expressed using an XML syntax, additional MIME types are needed to differentiate between languages.  XML-based formats add a suffix of +xml to their own MIME type; this convention is defined in (RFC 7303).

The following are some examples of common XML media types:

Registered
 Extensible HyperText Markup Language (XHTML): application/xhtml+xml (RFC 3236)
 Atom: application/atom+xml (RFC 4287)
 Extensible Stylesheet Language Transformations (XSLT): application/xslt+xml
 Scalable Vector Graphics (SVG): image/svg+xml
 Mathematical Markup Language (MathML): application/mathml+xml

Registration-In-Progress
 application/akn+xml
 application/rif+xml

Unregistered
 Really Simple Syndication (RSS 2.0): application/rss+xml

See also 
 Media type

External links
Official List of MIME Types

XML
MIME